Flamoudi or Phlamoudhi is a village in the Famagusta District of Cyprus, located on the northern coast, east of Kyrenia. It is under the de facto control of Northern Cyprus.

References

External links
 http://www.facesofphlamoudhi.com

Communities in Famagusta District
Populated places in İskele District